Mée is the name or part of the name of the following communes in France:

 Mée, Mayenne in the Mayenne department
 Le Mée, Eure-et-Loir in the Eure-et-Loir department
 Le Mée-sur-Seine in the Seine-et-Marne department
 Mées in the Landes department
 Les Mées, Alpes-de-Haute-Provence in the Alpes-de-Haute-Provence department
 Les Mées, Sarthe in the Sarthe department

See also 
 Mee (disambiguation)